Qahtān (also spelled as ) to distinguish between the tribe and the Qahtanite peoples, is an Arab tribal confederation. Qahtan is composed of three main tribes: Sanhan, Junb, and Rufaida. Today, members of the tribe and its sub-tribes are based in Saudi Arabia (where most of the tribe is congregated), Yemen, Qatar, Bahrain, Kuwait, Morocco and the United Arab Emirates.

Qahtan's sheikhdom was unanimously agreed by Western historians to be in the hands of the 'Al Qarmalah' family of the Jahader clan in the 19th century, and as early as 1961, the paramount sheikh of Qahtan was reported to be 'Khalil ibn Nasir ibn Qarmalah' (a descendant of Hadi ibn Qarmalah).

History

Al Qarmalah
The Qahtan tribe enjoyed It settled in one of the Najd regions known as Al-Quwai'iyah and expanded its influence in southern Najd, but Najd is subject to the rule Ibn Saud in the second Saudi state.
Several historians have described Qahtan as It became one of the powerful tribes of Najd for a while and then left for its original home in the south.

The Jahader branch of the Sanhan sub-tribe of Qahtan migrated to southern Najd from their homelands in Asir Region during the late 18th century and early 19th century under the leadership of Athfar al-Amaaj, Then they fought with an Alawite branch of the Mutair tribe at Jabal Subha in Al-Quwai'iyah, and Qahtan won in the battle and settled in Al-Quwaiyah, where they stayed for a period of time, then they returned to their homeland in the south because of the wars

Bahrain
Bahrain is a Gulf country that houses the tiniest number of Qahtanis compared to other Gulf countries, however, some members of the tribe have taken a relatively prominent role in the country. For example, the head of the Sunni Waqf Endowment Directorate is Rashid al-Hajri, a member of the Bani Hajer. Offshoot Hajri families such Almuhannada also take a public role such as former Member of Parliament Hamad Almuhannadi.

Notable members
 Hadi bin Qarmalah, one of the leaders of the first Saudi state, died in the battle of Wadi Al-Safra, and he is the father of Muhammad bin Hadi bin Qarmalah
 Theeb bin Shalah bin Hadlan, one of the most famous knights of the Qahtan tribe, and his father, Shalah bin Hadlan, wrote a poem after his death, and it became famous among the inhabitants of the Arabian Peninsula.
 Shalah bin Hadlan, one of the knights of the Qahtan tribe, and he is the father of Theeb bin Shalah bin Hadlan
 Muhammad bin Hadi bin Qarmalah, the old sheikh of the Qahtan tribe
 Saud al-Qahtani, former Advisor of the Saudi Royal court and the former General Supervisor of the Center for Studies and Information Affairs at minister rank. 
 Muhammad al-Qahtani, Saudi Arabian millennial Salafist anti-government rebel and spiritual leader ("Mahdi") of the 1979 seizure of the Grand Mosque of Mecca 
 Yasser al-Qahtani, Saudi Arabian footballer
 Haji Bakr Al-Qahtani, Saudi Arabian sprinter
 Mesfer Al-Qahtani, Saudi Arabian sprinter
 Abdulkareem Al-Qahtani, Saudi Arabian footballer
 Ali Al-Hajri, Kuwaiti member of the National Assembly
 Ali Bin Fahad Al-Hajri, Qatari ambassador to the United States
 Nasser Al Hajri, retired Kuwaiti football player
 Saud Al Hajiri, Qatari football player
 Saeed al-Hajri, Qatari bowler

References

Tribes of Arabia
Tribes of Saudi Arabia
Tribes of the United Arab Emirates
Tribes of Iraq
Semitic-speaking peoples
History of Saudi Arabia
History of the Arabian Peninsula
Ethnic groups in the Middle East
Bedouin groups
Yemeni tribes